Marciac is a commune in the Gers department, Occitania, southwestern France. It is known for its annual international festival Jazz in Marciac, which runs for a fortnight every summer.

Geography

History 
The name of this Bastide was received by the King of France's representative, seneschal Guichard de Marciac. The abbot of the monastery of La Case Dieu and the count of Pardiac had invited Guichard de Marciac with the hope he would ensure a safe place for Marciac's citizens and guarantee the prosperity of the city for years to come.

In 2008, during the financial crisis of 2007–2008, a team from Marciac won the 'best baguette' category in the French-hosted (but United States-sponsored) baking world cup, the Coupe du Monde de la Boulangerie.

Population

Festivals 

A great emphasis is placed on jazz in the town, which is taught as a regular subject in local schools. The town itself is known for its annual Jazz in Marciac festival, held for a fortnight in August. A marquee ("le chapiteau") capable of seating 6,000 is erected on the rugby field, with concerts hosted there every night for the duration of the festival, and free music from 11:00 till 20:00 every day. Stalls selling a variety of related and non-related merchandise are erected in and around the centre of the village square, where free concerts are given during the day. Other musical events take place around the town at the same time, such as the "Atelier de Jazz".

Economy 
 Agriculture: sunflower, maize

Notable people 
 Jean Laforgue, born in Marciac in 1782, is mainly known for having edited and censored the first edition (known as Edition Laforgue) of Giacomo Casanova's memoirs, Histoire de ma vie.

Sites of interest 
The town is characteristic of the bastides in the area – central village square with the town hall a main feature, with the village shops clustered along the four sides of the square. Wide arched pavements allow dining out of doors in the summer, when music is piped around the square. The town convent (now the town hall and cinema) and church steeples are lit up at night. The town is also home to many restaurants, including "Le Monde A L'Envers" (The World Upside Down), run by London chef Victoria Heath. A reference book ("The fabulous destiny of Marciac: From the dream of the founders to the passion for jazz") displays (in French) the story of the city, from its foundation in 1298 to the birth and the development of its famous jazz festival.

See also
 Communes of the Gers department

References

External links

 Tourism Office of Marciac, Plaisance and the surrounding Villages (in French)
 Reference book ("Le fabuleux destin de Marciac") and cultural projects about the "ideal city" of Marciac (translation in English available on the Website)

Communes of Gers
Gers communes articles needing translation from French Wikipedia